T-36 or T36 may refer to one of the following
Self-propelled barge T-36, a Soviet barge
 ,  a German warship of World War II
T-36 Halcon, a Spanish jet training aircraft
Prussian T-36, a 19th-century locomotive of Upper Silesian Narrow Gauge Railroads (:de:Preußische T 36)
 Beechcraft XT-36, a trainer aircraft
 T-36, a designation of the Yaominami Station, Tanimachi Line, Osaka Subway, Japan
 T36 (classification), a para-athletics classification for track athletes with cerebral palsy.